Lutter is a river in Göttingen, Lower Saxony, Germany. It is a tributary from the right (east) to the Leine.

See also
List of rivers of Lower Saxony

References 

Rivers of Lower Saxony
Rivers of Germany